Alberto Berasategui was the defending champion, but lost in the first round this year.

Albert Costa won the tournament, beating Todd Martin in the final, 7–6(7–4), 2–6, 6–3.

Seeds

Draw

Finals

Top half

Bottom half

References

Portugal Open
1999 ATP Tour
Estoril Open